The Rock Pile Peaks are a cluster of peaks rising to  between Wilson Pass and Rock Pile Point on Bermel Peninsula, Bowman Coast, Graham Land in Antarctica.

The peaks were photographed from the air by Sir Hubert Wilkins in 1928 and Lincoln Ellsworth in 1935, and were roughly mapped from the photographs by W. L. G. Joerg in 1937.  They were further photographed from the air by the United States Antarctic Service (USAS) in 1940 and then surveyed by Falkland Islands Dependencies Survey in 1947. The name Rock Pile Peaks was suggested by the United Kingdom Antarctic Place-Names Committee in 1952. It derives from Rock Pile Point, a name applied descriptively to Bermel Peninsula by USAS, 1939–41, but subsequently reapplied by the Advisory Committee on Antarctic Names to the east point of the cove.

References

Mountain ranges of Graham Land
Bowman Coast